Regilio Jacobs (born 12 August 1987) is a Dutch former professional footballer who played as a right back.

Career
Jacobs started his youth career with RKSV Prinses Irene before moving to the TOP Oss academy as a U12 player. He made his debut in professional football on 21 August 2006 against FC Emmen. In early 2011, he began playing for Tangerang Wolves in the Liga Primer Indonesia. In the 2011–12 season, he moved to Dutch Hoofdklasse club Dijkse Boys. He then played for RKSV Margriet and RKVV DESO, where he announced his retirement in 2017.

Personal life
On 2 November 2011, Jacobs made his reality television debut as a participant in the program New Chicks: Brabantse Nachten in Curaçao. At the end of 2015, he took part in the Dutch version of Temptation Island, which was broadcast from February 2016.

References

External links
 

1989 births
Living people
Sportspeople from Oss
Dutch footballers
Dutch people of Moluccan descent
Dutch expatriate footballers
TOP Oss players
Eerste Divisie players
Vierde Divisie players
Dutch expatriate sportspeople in Indonesia
Expatriate footballers in Indonesia
Association football fullbacks
Footballers from North Brabant